Lev Nikolaevich Nikolaev (16 November 1937 — 21 May 2011) was a Russian TV columnist, popularizer of science, culturologist.

Biography 
He was born on 16 November 1937 in the city of Slavyansk-on-Kuban. In 1954 he graduated from high school and art school of the city of Krasnodar. In 1960 he graduated MSU Faculty of Physics, in 1965 post-graduate year. He studied lakes, worked at the Limnological Institute of the Siberian Branch of the Russian Academy of Sciences. In the late 1950s and early 1960s he worked as a screenwriter, cameraman, director of documentary films. He studied film montage at Mosfilm group by Eldar Ryazanov. After finishing graduate school reserves the science and devotes himself to documentary filmmaking.

From 1973 he worked in television as a program editor, director and television presenter.

He was script author of more than a hundred documentaries and educational films, more than a dozen of which were awarded prizes of Soviet, Russian and international film festivals.

Death
On the night of 20 to 21 May 2011, after a long illness, he died in the 74th year of life. He was buried in Moscow at Kuntsevo Cemetery.

Awards 
 1980, 1986 —  USSR State Prize
  2004, 2005 —  TEFI
 2007 —   Order of Honor for his many years of fruitful work in the field of broadcasting.

References

External links
 ТРК Цивилизация
 Лев Николаев на peoples.ru
 Лев Николаевич в музее радио и телевидения

1937 births
2011 deaths
People from Slavyansk-na-Kubani
Soviet screenwriters
20th-century Russian screenwriters
Male screenwriters
20th-century Russian male writers
Recipients of the Order of Honour (Russia)
Recipients of the USSR State Prize
Soviet television presenters
Russian television presenters
Soviet cinematographers
Russian film directors
Academic staff of High Courses for Scriptwriters and Film Directors
Moscow State University alumni
Russian science writers
Russian limnologists
Russian documentary filmmakers